The 1986 IIHF Asian Oceanic Junior U18 Championship was the third edition of the IIHF Asian Oceanic Junior U18 Championship. It took place between 15 and 22 February 1986 in Adelaide, Australia. The tournament was won by Japan, who claimed their third title by finishing first in the standings. China and South Korea finished second and third respectively.

Standings

Fixtures
Reference

References

External links
International Ice Hockey Federation

IIHF Asian Oceanic U18 Championships
Asian
International ice hockey competitions hosted by Australia